The MLW M-420 was a diesel-electric locomotive manufactured between 1973 and 1977 in Montreal, Canada by the Montreal Locomotive Works. A total of 88 units were built for Canadian railways, including eight B units built for the British Columbia Railway; most of production went to Canadian National. Only seven units were sold outside of Canada, to the State Railways Institution in Venezuela and the Providence and Worcester Railroad in the United States.

The M-420 was one of the first locomotive models (along with the EMD GP38-2) to use the wide-nosed Canadian comfort cab, pioneered by Canadian National. By the early 1990s, variations on this cab design had become the standard of the industry. As with wide-nosed General Motors Diesel units from the same period, references to the model commonly add a "W" at the end of the model name, but it is not part of the official model designation. Most M-420 units rode on MLW ZWT (Zero Weight-Transfer) trucks.

Variations
Other variations of the M-420 were the M-420R, the M-424 built for service in Mexico and the M-420TR switcher. Five examples of the M-420R were built for the Providence and Worcester Railroad using trade-in parts and rode on Type B trucks, but otherwise resembled the M-420. The M-420TR was built in two variations, with two M-420TR units sold to Roberval & Saguenay and fifteen slightly different units (sometimes referred to as M-420TR-2) sold to Ferrocarril del Pacífico. Both M-420TR variations bore little resemblance to the other models, with a lowered hood, shorter frame and end-cab design.

Service with CN and BCOL
The first Canadian National M-420 was delivered in 1973. They provided service on the eastern side of Canada until their retirement in the late 1990s. By the time they were retired, many units were over 20 years old, and major Canadian railroads were purging their rosters of MLW and Alco locomotives to replace them with newer EMD and GE units. Bombardier HR-412s, purchased by CN and designed as successor to the M-420, were retired at the same time.

Service as power generators in Winter 1998
During the winter of 1998, a severe ice storm cut off power to many homes and businesses in Ontario and Quebec. CN M-420 3502 was hoisted off the rails by crane and rolled along a street in Boucherville in order to provide power in the community. The engine was driven approximately  under its own power to the city hall, where it then became a portable power generator. M-420 3508 was also lifted from the tracks to provide power to a school being used as a shelter, but problems prevented this from happening, and 3508 remained on standby. Both engines suffered minor gear case damage and carved grooves in the pavement.

M-420 today

Following their retirement from CN and BC Rail, some M-420 units were scrapped, but many were sold to shortline railways across North America for continued service. Omnitrax purchased several units, including some of the M-420B units from BC Rail. Larger shortlines such as Omnitrax have begun to scrap or sell their MLW units as a result of increased maintenance and reliability issues. The St Lawrence & Atlantic Railroad used a fleet of eleven former CN M-420 units as road power from 1998 to 2001. The Great Western Railway in Saskatchewan used an entire roster of MLW M-420s until 2017 when they announced that they are replacing the MLW fleet with GE fleet.

Original owners

See also
List of MLW diesel locomotives

References

External links

M-420W
Diesel-electric locomotives of Canada
Diesel-electric locomotives of the United States
Railway locomotives introduced in 1973
Locomotives with cabless variants
Standard gauge locomotives of Canada
Standard gauge locomotives of the United States
Standard gauge locomotives of Venezuela